Blackjack Island is an island in Ware County, in the U.S. state of Georgia named for its abundance of blackjack oak timber.

References

Landforms of Ware County, Georgia
Islands of Georgia (U.S. state)